The Chamberlain-Pennell House, also known as Hill of Skye, is a historic home located at Chester Heights, Delaware County, Pennsylvania. The building was built about 1722 and "modernized" in the mid-19th century.  The -story, brick house in configured in a "hall, passage, parlor" plan.  A -story kitchen wing was added to the west side sometime before 1798.

It was added to the National Register of Historic Places on December 27, 1977.

See also
National Register of Historic Places listings in Delaware County, Pennsylvania

References

Houses on the National Register of Historic Places in Pennsylvania
Houses completed in 1722
Houses in Delaware County, Pennsylvania
National Register of Historic Places in Delaware County, Pennsylvania
1722 establishments in Pennsylvania